Mamoutou N'Diaye (born 15 March 1990) is a Malian professional footballer who plays as a defensive midfielder for Belgian First Division A club Westerlo.

Career
N'Diaye is a central midfielder, who also plays as central defender. He persuaded Gent in the testing period he passed in Ghent in the winter break of the season 2008–09. He played his first minutes in the Belgian 1st Division on April 18, 2010, against Zulte-Waregem. He was the substitute of Christophe Lepoint. RSC Anderlecht was also interested in N'Diaye, but he chose KAA Gent because he would have too many competitors in Anderlecht, and also because his agent is a good friend of the manager of KAA Gent, Michel Louwagie. In the season 2010–2011, Mamoutou has been lent for one year to RAEC Mons.

In January 2019, he joined Romanian club Dinamo București. He scored his first goal for Dinamo on 22 April 2019, in a game against FC Botoșani. He was released by Dinamo in August 2020.

On 2 August 2021, he returned to Belgium and signed a two-year contract with Westerlo.

Honours 
Westerlo

 Belgian First Division B: 2021–22

References

External links
 
 
 
 

1990 births
Living people
Sportspeople from Bamako
Malian footballers
Association football midfielders
ASC Jeanne d'Arc players
Belgian Pro League players
Challenger Pro League players
K.A.A. Gent players
R.A.E.C. Mons players
S.V. Zulte Waregem players
Saudi Professional League players
Ohod Club players
Liga I players
FC Dinamo București players
Segunda División B players
CD Marino players
K.V.C. Westerlo players
Malian expatriate footballers
Malian expatriate sportspeople in Belgium
Malian expatriate sportspeople in Saudi Arabia
Malian expatriate sportspeople in Romania
Malian expatriate sportspeople in Spain
Expatriate footballers in Belgium
Expatriate footballers in Saudi Arabia
Expatriate footballers in Romania
Expatriate footballers in Spain
Mali international footballers
2015 Africa Cup of Nations players
2017 Africa Cup of Nations players
21st-century Malian people